Achryson jolyi is a species of longhorn beetle in the Cerambycinae subfamily. It was described by Monne in 2006. It is known from Venezuela.

References

Achrysonini
Beetles described in 2006